Geumseong (金城) was the capital of Silla, one of the Three Kingdoms of Korea.

Geumseong or Kŭmsŏng may also refer to:

 Geumseong City (錦城), the former name of Naju, a city in South Jeolla Province, South Korea
 Kumsong (North Korea) (金城), a disestablished county of Gangwon, Korea
 Geumseong-myeon, Damyang County, a township of Damyang County, South Jeolla
 Geumseong-myeon, Geumsan County, a township of Geumsan County, South Chungcheong
 Geumseong-myeon, Hadong County, a township of Hadong County, South Gyeongsang
 Geumseong-myeon, Jecheon, a township of Jecheon, North Chungcheong
 Geumseong-myeon, Uiseong County, a township of Uiseong County, North Gyeongsang
 Kum-song, a Korean given name